Mount Notre Dame High School (MND) is a Catholic, college-preparatory high school for young women. The school is affiliated with the Sisters of Notre Dame de Namur as a part of the Archdiocese of Cincinnati.

History 
In the early 19th century, Notre Dame Academy was a day and boarding school in downtown Cincinnati. Because of the poor conditions on Sixth Street, the school transferred the boarding school to a serene perch in Reading in 1860.  Three decades later, day school students joined them. MND became a diocesan high school in 1956 and has perpetuated their strong legacy as the oldest all-female academy in Cincinnati.

Academics 
MND offers a curriculum of over 100 courses configured to prepare and develop students for higher education. 20 Advanced Placement (AP) curricula can challenge high schoolers to obtain college credit.

 Biology
 Calculus AB
 Calculus BC
 Chemistry
 English Language and Composition
 English Literature and Composition
 European History
 French Language and Culture
 Human Geography
 Latin
 Music Theory
 Physics C: Mechanics 
 Psychology
 Spanish Language and Culture
 Statistics
 Studio Art Drawing
 Studio Art: 2D
 Studio Art: 3D
 U.S. Government and Politics
 U.S. History
 World History: Modern

Academic Honor Societies include Latin Club, Mu Alpha Theta, National Honor Society, Rho Kappa, and more.

Admissions 
Mount Notre Dame welcomes all young women who desire an education.  Admission acceptance is determined by a board of guidance counselors, administrators, and staff who review each application. MND’s admission process includes an online application. MND will request school records from each applicant’s current school.  School records typically include grade reports from 6th, 7th and first quarter/trimester of 8th grade, prior standardized test scores, and copies of any IEP/Accommodation plans.

Extracurricular activities

Athletics 
MND has won 25 state championships and six state runner up titles in five different sports.  Fall sports include cross country, field hockey, golf, soccer, tennis, volleyball. Basketball, bowling, and swimming & diving are in the winter. MND's spring sports are lacrosse, softball, and track & field. The Cougars compete in the Ohio High School Athletic Association and the Girls Greater Catholic League, "upholding integrity, sportsmanship, respect, and responsibility."

Clubs and Organizations 

 Ambassadors
 Art Club
 Book Club
 Cougars Who Code
 Drug Free Club of America
 French Club
 Société Honoraire de Français (National French Honor Society)
 Fun in Fitness
 Girls Athletic Association
 MND Academic League
 Japanese Culture Club
 Latin Club
 Latin Honor Society
 M;ND Strong
 Model United Nations
 Mu Alpha Theta
 National Honor Society
 Rho Kappa
 Science Club
 Spanish Club
 National Spanish Honor Society
 Theatre Enthusiasts
 Writer's Café

Notable alumnae
 Mel Thomas - NCAA women's basketball player
 Rose Lavelle - soccer player for United States national team
 Rachael Adams - Olympic volleyball player

References

External links
Mt. Notre Dame High School Homepage

Private schools in Cincinnati
Educational institutions established in 1860
High schools in Hamilton County, Ohio
Catholic secondary schools in Ohio
Sisters of Notre Dame de Namur schools
Girls' schools in Ohio
Roman Catholic Archdiocese of Cincinnati
1860 establishments in Ohio